Advanced Placement (AP) European History (also known as AP Euro, or APEH), is a course and examination offered by the College Board through the Advanced Placement Program. This course is for high school students who are interested in a first year university level course in European history. The course surveys European history from between 1300-1450 CE to the present, focusing on religious, social, economic, and political themes.

Course
The AP European History course covers historical events and processes across nine different units. Each unit is weighted equally on the exam, approximately 10-15%. The course units and sub-topics are as follows:

Unit 1: Renaissance and Exploration (1450 - 1648)
Contextualizing Renaissance and Discovery 
Italian Renaissance
Northern Renaissance
Printing
New Monarchies
Technological Advances and the Age of Exploration
Rivals on the World Stage
Colonial Expansion and the Columbian Exchange
The Slave Trade
The Commercial Revolution
Causation in the Renaissance and Age of Discovery
Unit 2: Age of Reformation (1450 - 1648)
Contextualizing 16th- and 17th-Century Challenges and Developments
Luther and the Protestant Reformation
Protestant Reform Continues
Wars of Religion
The Catholic Reformation
16th-Century Society and Politics
Art of the 16th Century: Mannerism and Baroque Art
Causation in the Age of Reformation and the Wars of Religion
Unit 3: Absolutism and Constitutionalism (1648 - 1815)
Contextualizing State Building
The English Civil War and the Glorious Revolution
Continuities and Changes to Economic Practice and Development
Economic Development and Mercantilism
The Dutch Golden Age
Balance of Power
Absolutist Approaches to Power
Comparison in the Age of Absolutism and Constitutionalism
Unit 4: Scientific, Philosophical, and Political Developments (1648 - 1815)
Contextualizing the Scientific Revolution and the Enlightenment
The Scientific Revolution
The Enlightenment
18th-Century Society and Demographics
18th-Century Culture and Arts
Enlightened and Other Approaches to Power
Causation in the Age of the Scientific Revolution and the Enlightenment
Unit 5: Conflict, Crisis, and Reaction in the Late 18th Century (1648 - 1815)
Contextualizing 18th-Century States
The Rise of Global Markets
Britain's Acendency
The French Revolution
The French Revolution's Effects
Napoleon's Rise, Dominance, and Defeat
The Congress of Vienna
Romanticism
Continuity and Change in 18th-Century States
Unit 6: Industrialization and Its Effects (1815 - 1914)
Contextualizing Industrialization and Its Origins and Effects
The Spread of Industy Throughout Europe
Second Wave Industrialization and Its Effects
Social Effects of Industrialization
The Concert of Europe and European Conservatism
Reactions and Revolutions
Ideologies of Change and Reform Movements
19th-Century Social Reform
Institutional Responses and Reform
Causation in the Age of Industrialization
Unit 7: 19th-Century Perspective and Political Developments (1815 - 1914)
Contextualizing 19th-Century Perspectives and Political Developments
Nationalism
National Unification and Diplomatic Treaties
Darwinism, Social Darwinism
The Age of Progress and Modernity
New Imperialism: Motivations and Methods
Imperialism's Global Effects
19th-Century Culture and Arts
Causation in 19th-Century Perspectives and Political Development
Unit 8: 20th-Century Global Conflicts (1914 - present)
Contextualizing 20th-Century Global Conflicts
World War I
The Russian Revolution and Its Effects
Versailles Conference and Peace Settlement
Global Economic Crisis
Fascism and Totalitarianism
Europe During the Interwar Period
World War II
The Holocaust
20th-Century Cultural, Intellectual, and Artistic Developments
Continuity and Changes in an Age of Global Conflict
Unit 9: Cold War and Contemporary Europe
Contextualizing Cold War and Contemporary Europe
Rebuilding Europe
The Cold War
Two Super Powers Emerge
Postwar Nationalism, Ethnic Conflict, and Atrocities
Contemporary Western Democracies
The Fall of Communism
20th-Century Feminism
Decolonization
The European Union
Migration and Immigration
Technology
Globalization
20th- and 21st-Century Culture, Arts, and Demographic Trends
Continuity and Change in the 20th and 21st Centuries

Exam
The AP exam for European History is divided into two sections, comprising 55 multiple-choice questions (with four answer choices), three short-answer questions, and two essay responses (one thematic Long Essay Question (LEQ) and one Document Based Question (DBQ)).  The multiple-choice and short-answer sections are to be completed in 55 minutes and 40 minutes respectively.  The essay section is to be completed in 100 minutes (including the mandated 15-minute reading period). The DBQ is graded out of 7 points and the LEQ is graded out of 6 points. This new structure went into effect beginning Fall 2017.
The exam grade is weighted evenly between the multiple-choice and free-response sections.  The DBQ is weighted at 25 percent while the FRQ/LEQ is weighted at 15 percent.  The Short Answer is weighted 20 percent.

Approximately half of the multiple-choice questions cover the period from 1450 to the French Revolution and Napoleonic era, and half cover the period from the French Revolution and Napoleonic era to the present, evenly divided between the nineteenth and twentieth centuries.  About one-third of the questions focus on cultural and intellectual themes, one-third on political and diplomatic themes, and one-third on social and economic themes. Many questions draw on knowledge of more than one chronological period or theme. Although this is the general trend based on past AP Exams, it is not mandated that the exam follow this format. In recent years and present, the multiple choice portion is Stimulus Based, meaning the students are given an excerpt of a speech or writing, photograph, or painting, to analyze and answer questions and/or give presentations on the given info.

Free Response sections
The Free Response sections of the test offer some choice.
 Short Answer Question (SAQ): (complete 3 of 4)
 Two questions spanning 1600-2001 (both mandatory)
 Choice between questions Q3 (periods 1 and 2) and Q4 (periods 3 and 4)
 Long Essay Question (LEQ): (complete 1 of 3)
 Choice between questions Q1 (period 1), Q2 (periods 2 and 3) and Q3 (periods 3 and 4)

Grade distributions
The grade distributions as of 2007 are as follows:

References

External links
AP European History at CollegeBoard.com
AP European History Course Home Page
European History Study Guide on Albert

History education
History of Europe
Advanced Placement